CJCW is a Canadian radio station broadcasting at 590 AM in Sussex, New Brunswick. The station plays an adult contemporary format and is owned & operated by the Maritime Broadcasting System. The station has been on the air since June 14, 1975.

History
Island Radio was granted approval on November 8, 1975 to broadcast in Sussex with a power of 500 watts during the day, and 250 watts at night. Overnight programming was provided by CKCW-FM in Moncton.

On June 15, 1975, CJCW first began broadcasting. On April 7, 1978, the daytime operating power was increased to 1000 watts. Night operation was left at 250 watts.

In 1986, the station was acquired by Maritime Broadcasting System.

In 2000, CJCW switched to full-time local programming instead of simulcasting CKCW during overnight periods. The station was branded as Favourites 590 CJCW.

On September 10, 2007, the station (along with sister stations CKNB, CFAN-FM and CKDH-FM) was rebranded to 590 CJCW with "Your community, your radio station" as the positioning statement.

See also
Maritime Broadcasting System

External links
590 CJCW

590 CJCW – Online webcast

References

Jcw
Jcw
Jcw
Radio stations established in 1975
1975 establishments in New Brunswick